Vladislav Rusanov (known until 2020 as Vladislav Bakonin,; born 1 August 2001) is a Russian professional footballer who plays for Energetik-BGU Minsk in Belarus.

Personal life
In 2020, he changed his last name from Bakonin to Rusanov.

References

External links 
 
 

2001 births
Living people
Russian footballers
Association football goalkeepers
Russian expatriate footballers
Expatriate footballers in Belarus
FC Zenit Saint Petersburg players
FC Energetik-BGU Minsk players